XHRCA-FM is a radio station serving the Comarca Lagunera of Torreón, Coahuila and Gómez Palacio, Durango. Broadcasting on 102.7 FM, XHRCA is owned by Multimedios Radio as FM Tú with a Top 40/CHR format.

History

The concession for XERCA-AM was awarded in April 1952 to Radio Torreón, S.A. The station was known as XEOB-AM—the second station to use the call letters in the Comarca Lagunera, after a previous station in Gómez Palacio—and operated on 1490 kHz. The original concessionaire was Clemente Serna Martínez, founder of Radio Programas de México. The station changed its call letters to XETAA-AM in 1965, complementing then-sisters XETB and XETC, and moved down the dial to 920 kHz in 1966.

In 1992, XETAA was transferred to Promotora Radiofónica de la Laguna. Two years later, it became an AM-FM combo, one of 80 authorized at the time, with the sign-on of XHTAA-FM 102.7. In 1998, the callsigns were changed to XERCA-AM and XHRCA-FM (the latter previously used by Mexico City station XHFAJ-FM). In 2015, XHRCA and 24 other radio stations were folded into Grupo Radio Centro, a business owned by the same family as GRM.

On October 29, 2019, Multimedios Radio assumed operational control of XHRCA and relaunched it as FM Tú with an urban format, similar to XHFMTU-FM in Monterrey. On January 8, 2020, the station presented the Federal Telecommunications Institute with the surrender of its 5,000-watt AM facility in Gómez Palacio, remaining on FM only.

References

External links
FM Tú Torreon Facebook

Radio stations in Coahuila
Radio stations in the Comarca Lagunera
Multimedios Radio
1952 establishments in Mexico
Radio stations established in 1952